Josimar Mosquera Angulo (born 12 October 1982) is a Colombian football defender who currently plays for Argentine club J.J. de Urquiza.

Career
Mosquera started his career in Argentine football with Godoy Cruz de Mendoza of the Argentine 2nd Division. In 2005, he was part of the team that won the Apertura 2005 tournament, and at the end of the 2005-2006 season Godoy Cruz were promoted to the Primera Division for the first time in their history.

In 2006 Mosquera was signed by Estudiantes de La Plata, and in his first season with the club they won the Apertura 2006 title, but Mosquera watched from the sidelines as he did not play any first team games.

During the Clausura 2007 Mosquera made the breakthrough into the first team and scored his only goal for the club in a 2-0 win over Club Atlético Banfield. At the end of the clausura he moved to Arsenal.

In 2009 Mosquera joined Al-Ahli in Saudi Arabia and was loaned out to Colón de Santa Fe in 2010.

Titles

External links
Josimar Mosquera – Argentine Primera statistics at Fútbol XXI  

1982 births
Living people
Colombian footballers
Colombian expatriate footballers
Colombia international footballers
Association football defenders
Arsenal de Sarandí footballers
Atlético Nacional footballers
Al-Ahli Saudi FC players
Club Atlético Colón footballers
Estudiantes de La Plata footballers
Gimnasia y Esgrima de Jujuy footballers
Godoy Cruz Antonio Tomba footballers
Cobresal footballers
Club Almirante Brown footballers
Independiente Rivadavia footballers
Club y Biblioteca Ramón Santamarina footballers
Chilean Primera División players
Argentine Primera División players
Primera Nacional players
Saudi Professional League players
Categoría Primera A players
Expatriate footballers in Chile
Expatriate footballers in Argentina
Colombian expatriate sportspeople in Chile
Colombian expatriate sportspeople in Argentina
Sportspeople from Antioquia Department